Miss Bahamas is a national Beauty pageant in The Bahamas.

History
The Miss Bahamas Committee staged the Miss Bahamas Pageant for 40 years. In 2002, the franchise for the Miss Universe pageant was awarded to Theophilus Fritz and Gaynell Rolle who ran the pageant until 2009.  In 2010, the Miss Bahamas Organization (MBO) headed by journalist Michelle Malcolm was awarded the franchise for Miss Universe .  At the time, MBO - which was formed in 2006 - was already producing the Miss World Bahamas pageant since the year 2007.

After receiving the Miss Universe franchise, MBO combined the Miss World and Miss Universe systems into one local pageant, crowning one winner who would compete in both international pageants.  This was the first time in the history of pageants in The Bahamas that the license for both Miss Universe and Miss World were held by the same organization. Braneka Bassett competed in Miss Universe in 2010 and went unplaced.  She then competed in Miss World that same year and advanced to the semifinals. The following year, MBO crowned two winners - Anastagia Pierre for Miss Universe and Sasha Joyce for Miss World.  Runners up were sent to Miss Supranational and Miss Intercontinental. In 2012 due to a change in date of the Miss World pageant, Daronique Young - 1st runner up to Sasha Joyce in 2011 - represented The Bahamas at the Miss World competition where she went unplaced. Celeste Marshall was crowned Miss Universe Bahamas in 2012 and competed in Miss Universe in 2012. De'Andra Bannister was crowned Miss World Bahamas and competed in Miss World in 2013 and went unplaced.

In 2013 after undergoing a major restructuring process, MBO separated the two national pageants into separate events - Miss Universe Bahamas and Miss World Bahamas. In 2014 MBO sent Tomacina "Tomii" Culmer to Miss Universe, and this was the last time MBO would hold the Miss Universe franchise for The Bahamas.

In 2015, 2016 and 2017 the Miss Universe franchise for The Bahamas as Miss Universe Bahamas was operated by Albany Resort and Ivy Lane Ltd. Michelle Collie and Loretta Thomas were National Directors.  In 2015, Toria Nichole Penn represented The Bahamas at Miss Universe, and in 2016 Cherell Williamson competed at Miss Universe. In 2017 Ivy Lane Ltd. sent Yasmine Cooke as Miss Universe Bahamas to Las Vegas to compete at Miss Universe. This would be the last time Albany Resort together with Ivy Lane Ltd. would hold the Miss Universe franchise for The Bahamas.

In 2018 the Miss Universe franchise for The Bahamas as Miss Universe Bahamas is operated by Westpoint Media Global Ltd. At the time, Westpoint Media was already producing the Miss Teen Bahamas Scholar Pageant since the year 2016 and the Miss Teen Bahamas International Pageant from 2012 to 2015. Headed by Anthony Smith, he became the National Director on June 4, 2018. PJ Michelle Douglas Sands is the Director of Pageant and Branding Affairs.  The Miss Bahamas Universe Executive Board and Committee is composed of several professionals with decades of experience in pageantry, entertainment, coaching and careers in law, medicine, government, tourism, hospitality, entertainment, TV, stage and film.  Westpoint Media opted to change the name back to Miss Bahamas Universe to restore and continue to retain use of Miss Bahamas as this is the Official and National Pageant of The Bahamas with Miss Universe being the most coveted title in the worldwide pageant scene. Contestants from around the world compete for the title of Miss Universe each year.

On September 16, 2018 Danielle Simone Grant was selected as Miss Bahamas Universe and will represent The Bahamas in Bangkok, Thailand at Miss Universe on December 16, 2018.

Titleholders

Miss Bahamas Universe

The main winner of Miss Bahamas was previously sending to Miss Universe pageant. Since 2018 Miss Universe Bahamas Organization took the franchise in the Bahamas.

Miss Bahamas World
The Bahamas sent the official candidates to Miss World since 1966. The Miss Bahamas World winner sends to Miss World pageant.

See also
 Mister Bahamas
 Miss Universe Bahamas
 Bahamas at major beauty pageants

References

External links
 Official website

 
Beauty pageants in the Bahamas
1963 establishments in the Bahamas
Recurring events established in 1963
Bahamian awards
Bahamas